Robert Boates (born 1954 in Hamilton, Ontario, Canada) is a Canadian poet.  In 1989 he suffered a head injury which caused brain trauma, damaging the language center of his brain.  His poetry, which is clear, erudite, well-crafted, intelligent, and economical, "provides a literary voice for survivors of brain trauma, documenting his passage in a second life."  In 2006 he published He Carries Fear with Cactus Tree Press.  His style, in its contemporariness-without-ornament, can be reminiscent of Larry Levis.

References

1954 births
Living people
Writers from Hamilton, Ontario
21st-century Canadian poets
Canadian male poets
21st-century Canadian male writers